Center Rutland is an unincorporated village in the town of Rutland, Rutland County, Vermont, United States. The community is located along U.S. Route 4 Business and Vermont Route 3 on the western border of the city of Rutland. Center Rutland had a post office from May 1, 1850, until 

March 19, 2011; it still has its own ZIP code, 05736.

References

Unincorporated communities in Rutland County, Vermont
Unincorporated communities in Vermont